P. nivalis may refer to:
 Peperomia nivalis, a radiator plant species
 Phalacrocorax nivalis, a cormorant species
 Phlox nivalis, a flowering plant species
 Pinguicula nivalis, a species described in Carnivorous Plant Newsletter
 Plantago nivalis, a plantain species
 Plectrophenax nivalis, a passerine bird species
 Pleurothallis nivalis, an orchid species
 Podocarpus nivalis, a conifer species
 Primula nivalis, a herb species
 Pyrus nivalis, a pear species